The IWI Negev (also known as the Negev NG-5) is a 5.56×45mm NATO light machine gun developed by Israel Weapon Industries (IWI), formerly Israel Military Industries Ltd. (IMI).

In 2012, IWI introduced the Negev NG-7 7.62×51mm NATO general-purpose machine gun and is used by the Israel Defense Forces (mainly in the infantry, combat engineer and special forces units). The NG stands for Next Generation.

Design details

The Negev is a gas-operated selective fire light machine gun that uses propellant gases from the barrel to cycle a short-stroke gas piston operating system under the barrel and a rotary bolt locking mechanism. The bolt itself features 4 radial locking lugs that engage the barrel extension and its rotation is controlled by a pin on the bolt body, which rides inside a camming guide machined into the bolt carrier. The bolt contains a spring-powered casing extractor unit, while a lever ejector is housed inside the receiver (it is rotated by the recoiling bolt carrier).

The design was meant to be reliable, especially in adverse conditions. In 1997, it was officially adopted by the Israeli Defense Forces (IDF).

Striker firing mechanism 
The Negev is striker-fired, where the bolt carrier assembly acts as the striker, and fires from an open bolt position. A lever-type fire control selector switch is provided ("A" – for fully automatic fire and "R" – for semi-automatic fire), installed on the left side of the pistol grip, which doubles as a manual safety against accidental firing. The safe "S" position disables the sear mechanism (which makes it impossible to cock the bolt carrier), by lifting the lever responsible for holding the bolt carrier in the forward position and disconnects the trigger mechanism from the sear. The weapon can be secured safe regardless of the position of the bolt carrier group. The cocking handle is equipped with a ratcheting mechanism that immobilizes the partially cocked bolt carrier.

Gas regulator 
The Negev's adjustable gas regulator has three settings:
 setting "1" is used exclusively when feeding from a magazine (rate of fire in this mode is around 850–1,050 rounds per minute).
 setting "2" is used in normal operating conditions when feeding from a belt (rate of fire in this mode is also around 850–1,050 rounds per minute).
 setting "3" which is used under adverse operating conditions, such as in the presence of dust, dirt or heavy fouling (rate of fire in this mode is around 950–1,150 rounds per minute).
Early prototypes used a different 3-position gas adjustment system:
setting "1"—for normal operations.
setting "2"—for adverse environmental conditions.
setting "3"—isolates the gas system, and is used to launch rifle grenades with the use of a grenade-launching blank cartridge drawn from a special 12-round magazine from the Galil rifle.

Barrel 
The Negev has a quick-change chrome-lined barrel that is manufactured using a cold hammer forging process. The barrel is fitted with a slotted flash suppressor and a fixed carry handle, which is used to transport the weapon and change-out an overheated barrel. The barrel can be changed only after lifting open the feed tray cover.

Additionally, a multifunction muzzle device was designed, used to launch rifle grenades.

Sights 
The Negev's iron sights (closed-type) consist of a front post (adjustable for both windage and elevation) and a rear aperture sight with an elevation adjustment drum, with 300 to 1,000 m range settings in 100 m increments. For night-time operation the weapon is equipped with gaseous tritium-illuminated vials (supplied by Betalight): one installed in the front sight post, and two—on a notch sight under the standard aperture sight arm (before use, the rear sight leaf is pivoted forward to expose the night notch sight). A rail is integrated into the receiver top cover that allows optical day and night-time sights to be mounted to the weapon. The barrel can also be optionally fitted with mounting hardware that would allow the Negev to mount a laser pointer or reflex sight.

The machine gun has a metal side-folding (right side) stock and a removable bipod, installed to the forward end of the handguard and folded under the handguard when stowed. The receiver also has slots and hooks used to secure the weapon to vehicle mounting hardware.

Cartridges 
The Negev uses the 5.56×45mm NATO intermediate cartridge and is optimized for the SS109 bullet. Field maintenance involves stripping the weapon down to six main groups: the barrel, stock, bolt carrier, bolt, bipod and return mechanism. All parts, including the quick-change barrels are fully interchangeable. The Negev NG-7 uses the 7.62×51mm NATO full-power battle rifle cartridge.

Ammunition feeding 
The Negev feeds from an M27 disintegrating, open-link ammunition belt, carried in a 150-round fabric container that clips into the magazine well, or alternatively from a 35-round box magazine from the Galil assault rifle, or a 30-round STANAG magazine from the M16 rifle (with the use of an adapter). 200-round ammunition belt containers are also available. Belted ammunition is introduced into the feed tray port from the left side, while the magazine is inserted vertically into the magazine well at the base of the receiver.

The feed system, which loosely copies the vz. 52 and the PK, uses a lever mounted on the left wall of the receiver and driven by a cam in the recoiling bolt carrier to turn a small feed pawl. The belt is pushed by the pawl only during the rearward movement of the bolt carrier.

The non-reciprocating charging handle is located on the right side of the weapon.

Variants

Negev NG-5 

 Negev NG-5 – is a light machine gun is chambered in 5.56×45mm NATO cartridge.
 Negev NG-5 SF –  is a compact variant of the Negev NG-5. It uses a shorter barrel and is primarily fitted with the (Negev assault grip).

Negev NG-7 
 Negev NG-7 – is a general-purpose machine gun is chambered for the 7.62×51mm NATO cartridge. It is fed by a 100- or 125-round assault drum magazine containing disintegrating M13 NATO standard ammunition belts or NATO standard ammunition belts and has two gas regulator settings as the possibility for box magazine feeding was omitted. The IWI eLog weapon-embedded sensor module was added to collect and store data on the actual use of the weapons for more efficient maintenance management and servicing by armourers.
 Negev NG-7 SF – is a compact variant of the Negev NG-7. It uses a shorter barrel and is primarily fitted with a side grip (Negev assault grip).

Gallery

Users

: Used by Military Police of São Paulo State, Military Police of Amazonas State
: Used by Battalion d'intervention rapide

: Used by mechanised infantry, paratroopers and the Special Forces.
 : Used by Presidential Guard units in 2010

 Since May 2010, standard issue light machine gun of the GAF. Heavily used by Georgian units in Afghanistan.
: 5.56 variant serving as standard issue LMG for Special Forces from earlier. An order for 16,479 NG-7s was placed in March 2020 to replace all the INSAS Light Machine guns present with the Indian Army, which were subsequently delivered in February 2021.
: The Negev was adopted by the Israel Defense Forces in 1997 and the Negev NG-7 was adopted in 2012.
:
: Kenya Defense Forces
: Mexican Federal Police
: Police Special Forces
: Paraguayan Army.
: Philippine National Police Philippine Coast Guard
: Used by special forces and commandos
: Used by Tanzanian Special Forces.
: Purchased 1,000 machine guns in 2007, and another 550 in 2008.
: In service with Naval Special Forces.
: Known as Fort-401

See also
Daewoo Precision Industries K3
M249 light machine gun
M60 machine gun
FN Minimi
FN Maximi
FN EVOLYS
FN MAG
HK MG4
HK MG5
PK machine gun
PKP Pecheneg machine gun
QJY-88
QJS-161
QJY-201
RPL-20
Ultimax 100

References

External links

 The Negev LMGs in the IWI official website:
 Negev SF
 Negev NG-7
 Negev NG-7 SF
 Israel Weapon Industries – Homepage (Main Website)
 Israel Weapon Industries – Negev (Main Website)
 Israel Weapon Industries – (Main Negev LMG Brochure) 

5.56×45mm NATO machine guns
Light machine guns
7.62×51mm NATO machine guns
General-purpose machine guns
Firearms of Israel
Military equipment introduced in the 1990s